The Sorrow was an Austrian metal band from Vorarlberg. They were formed in 2005 by Mathias Schlegel and Andreas Mäser from the band Disconnected and Dominik Immler and Tobias Schädler from the band Distance. In 2006, they signed a recording contract with Drakkar Records, and in 2007 released their debut album Blessings from a Blackened Sky.

Discography

Albums

Singles 
 Death from a Lover's Hand (2007)
 Knights of Doom (2007)
 Where Is the Sun? (2009)
 Crossing Jordan (2010)
 Perspectives  (2012)

Music videos 
 Knights of Doom (2007)
 Where Is the Sun? (2009)
 Crossing Jordan (2010)
 Farewells (2011)
 Burial Bridge  (2012)
 Perspectives   (2012)
 Retracing Memories (2013)

References

External links 

 

Austrian heavy metal musical groups